Medabots AX: Metabee version and Medabots AX: Rokusho version are spin-off fighting games of the Medabots series, developed and published by Natsume.

Metabots AX was never released in Japan, instead an almost identical version called Medarot G was released.

Plot 
Ikki Tenryou and his Medabot, Metabee or Rokusho enter a tournament to win the ultimate Medabot.

Gameplay 
The gameplay of Medabots AX is different to that of previous instalments of the series as it is more of a platform fighting game much like Digimon Battle Spirit. Though much like the previous games, the player constructs their own Medabots using pieces won from battles. The player controls the leader Medabot and utilises various Medabot pieces and special abilities to defeat the enemy.

References 

2002 video games
Game Boy Advance games
Natsume (company) games
Video games about robots
Fighting games
Video games developed in Japan
Video games with alternative versions
Virtual Console games